Naseem is a 1995 Hindi film directed by Saeed Akhtar Mirza. The film starred well-known Urdu poet Kaifi Azmi, Mayuri Kango, Seema Kelkar, Surekha Sikri, Kulbhushan Kharbanda and Kay Kay Menon.

Plot 
The film is set between June and December 1992, the days preceding the infamous demolition of the structure of Babri Masjid at Ayodhya in the Indian province of Uttar Pradesh by Hindu fundamentalists  groups. The relationship between Naseem, a 15-year-old schoolgirl belonging to a middle class Bombay based Muslim family and her ailing grandfather takes the story forward as the family watches with increasing horror on their TV the news of the growing tension between Muslims and Hindus. The grandfather keeps regaling her with stories of life marked by communal harmony in the pre-independence city of Agra. As communal tension erupts in the city of Bombay, Naseem notices changing dynamics at her school and in the neighborhood, while her grandfather watches helplessly at a city getting deeply divided on communal lines. The old man dies on 6 December coinciding with the news of the destruction of the mosque.

Cast 
Mayuri Kango as Naseem
Kaifi Azmi as Naseem's Grandfather
Seema Kelkar as Naseem's Grandmother
Kay Kay Menon as Zafar
Salim Shah as Mushtaq
Makrand Deshpande
Kulbhushan Kharbanda
Surekha Sikri

Accolades 
The film won National Award for Best Direction and Best Screenplay for Saeed Akhtar Mirza.

References

External links 
 

1995 films
1990s Hindi-language films
Films whose director won the Best Director National Film Award
Films whose writer won the Best Original Screenplay National Film Award
Films directed by Saeed Akhtar Mirza